or  is a village in Alta Municipality in Troms og Finnmark county, Norway. Langfjordbotn is located at the innermost end of the Langfjorden, a part of the main Altafjorden. Langfjordbotn has a population (2012) of 114 residents. The village lies along the European route E06 highway, just east of the municipal (and county) border with Kvænangen.

Langfjordbotn is known for its lush nature, and good conditions for growing potatoes and berries. Langfjordbotn is a popular destination for tourists from all over the world, most on their way to the North Cape, but many stay an extra day. In Bognelvdalen, a valley at the end of the fjord, there is an old tourist attraction called "Bubbelen". "Bubbelen" is the exit of an underground river, where the water comes gushing out and running into the river Bognelv, and is most spectacular in the spring when the flow of water is strongest.

There are five dairy farms, together with the local school and community center in Langfjordbotn. In addition to farming, there are some family-run tourism businesses as well as the Finnmarkskollektivet which deals with adolescents with substance abuse problems. The fjord is a versatile area for outdoor activities with the nearby fjords, plains, mountains, forests, and marshes. In winter, there are excellent conditions for skiing, summit hikes, snowmobile driving and sled dog racing.

The German battleship Scharnhorst had its base there during World War II.

References

External links 

Alta, Norway
Villages in Finnmark